The Liebknecht Range is a mountain range,  long, forming the southwest arm of the Humboldt Mountains in Queen Maud Land, Antarctica. It was discovered and plotted from air photos by the Third German Antarctic Expedition, 1938–39, and was mapped from air photos and surveys by Sixth Norwegian Antarctic Expedition, 1956–60. It was remapped by the Soviet Antarctic Expedition, 1960–61, and named after the German revolutionary Karl Liebknecht.

See also
Abolin Rock
Arsen'yev Rocks

References

Mountain ranges of Queen Maud Land
Humboldt Mountains (Antarctica)